Catherine Romano (born 9 May 1972) is a French gymnast. She competed in five events at the 1988 Summer Olympics.

References

External links
 

1972 births
Living people
French female artistic gymnasts
Olympic gymnasts of France
Gymnasts at the 1988 Summer Olympics
Sportspeople from Créteil
20th-century French women